Acilepis is a genus of Asian plants in the Vernonieae within the daisy family.

Taxonomy

Species
, Plants of the World online has 37 accepted species:

 formerly included
numerous species now considered members of other genera: Dicoma Pacourina 
 Acilepis cirsiifolia - Pacourina edulis 
 Acilepis lanata - Dicoma tomentosa

References 

Asteraceae genera
Vernonieae